Ciosenka is a small river of Poland, a tributary of the Dzierżązna near the village Dzierżązna.

Rivers of Poland
Rivers of Łódź Voivodeship